Puka Urqu (Quechua puka red, urqu mountain, "red mountain", also spelled Puca Orkho) is a mountain in the Bolivian Andes which reaches a height of approximately . It is located in the Chuquisaca Department, Jaime Zudáñez Province, Icla Municipality.

References 

Mountains of Chuquisaca Department